State Highway 365 (SH 365)  is a proposed toll road in Mission from FM 1016 to US 281. The route is currently under construction.

Route description
SH 365 is planned to begin at an intersection with FM 1016. From there, it will head east and south to US 281.

History
SH 365 was designated on February 24, 1988, as a route from SH 361 in Ingleside to SH 35 at Aransas Pass. On October 13, 1988, the route was cancelled and became an extension of SH 363. SH 365 was designated on April 29, 2010, but only from FM 1016 to FM 3072. On July 26, 2012, SH 365 was extended south to US 281, completing the proposed routing. In March 2016, the Hidalgo County Regional Mobility Authority (HCRMA) has commenced construction on phase one of segment 3 of the Hidalgo County loop (SH 365) in Hidalgo County.

References

365
Transportation in Hidalgo County, Texas